Josh Edwards (born 18 May 2004) is an English professional footballer who plays for Fleetwood Town, as a left-back.

Career
Hailing from Poulton-le-Fylde, Lancashire, he started his career in the academy at National League side Stockport County in the summer of 2020. He made his professional debut for the first team on 15 January 2022 at the age of seventeen, when he replaced Mark Kitching as a substitute in the 3–0 FA Trophy Fourth round win over Southern Football League side Larkhall Athletic at Edgeley Park. He went onto two make two more starts in the FA Trophy as Stockport progressed to the semi-finals. In January 2022, he was sent out on dual-registration to North West Counties Football League Division One South side Stockport Town, where he went on to score twice, against New Mills and Cammell Laird. In March 2022, he was sent out on a youth loan to Northern Premier League Premier Division side Stalybridge Celtic for the remainder of the season.

On 27 June 2022, he signed for EFL League One side Fleetwood Town on a two-year contract and went straight into the Development Squad. He made his first team debut on 30 August 2022, starting in the EFL Trophy group stage game against Barrow which Fleetwood won on penalties having initially drawn 1-1.

Career statistics

References

2004 births
Living people
People from Poulton-le-Fylde
Stockport County F.C. players
Stockport Town F.C. players
Stalybridge Celtic F.C. players
Fleetwood Town F.C. players
Northern Premier League players
North West Counties Football League players
Association football defenders
English footballers